Merabi Mamukovich Uridia (born 7 April 1993) is a Russian football player. He also holds Georgian citizenship. He plays for FC Rubin Kazan.

Club career
He made his debut in the Russian Football National League for FC Neftekhimik Nizhnekamsk on 11 March 2013 in a game against FC Rotor Volgograd.

Honours

Individual
 Russian Professional Football League Zone Ural-Privolzhye best player (2018–19).

References

External links
Career summary by sportbox.ru  

1993 births
Sportspeople from Batumi
Georgian emigrants to Russia
Living people
Russian footballers
Russia youth international footballers
Association football midfielders
FC Rubin Kazan players
FC Neftekhimik Nizhnekamsk players
FC Volga Nizhny Novgorod players
FC Shukura Kobuleti players
FC Torpedo Moscow players
Russian First League players
Russian Second League players
Erovnuli Liga players